Saint-Josse-ten-Noode or Sint-Joost-ten-Node, often simply called Saint-Josse or Sint-Joost, is one of the 19 municipalities of the Brussels-Capital Region, Belgium. Located in the north-eastern part of the region, it is bordered by the City of Brussels and Schaerbeek.

, the municipality had a total population of 26,965. From a total of 581 municipalities in Belgium, Saint-Josse is both the smallest in area size and the most densely populated. In common with all of Brussels' municipalities, it is legally bilingual (French–Dutch).

History

Named after Saint Judoc, Saint-Josse was originally a farming village on the outskirts of Brussels. In the centuries before the dismantling of the ramparts encircling Brussels, Saint-Josse was also the place where noblemen built country estates, the most notable amongst them the Castle of the Dukes of Brabant built by Philip the Good in 1456. The area surrounding that castle was planted with wine groves, which explains the presence of the bushel of grapes in the municipality's coat of arms.

After the demolition of the ramparts, Saint-Josse was one of the first areas outside Brussels to urbanise. The rich built houses around the new boulevards and higher parts of the municipality, while industries and workman's cottages were built in the lower lying part close to the river Senne. In 1855, 58% of the land area of Saint-Joose was annexed by the municipality of the City of Brussels to make way for the /, the /, the / and the / of the newly created Leopold Quarter (now the European Quarter).

According to an inventory of architecture commissioned by the Brussels Region, Saint-Josse has on average the oldest buildings of all 19 Brussels municipalities.

Demographics
While foreigners were a majority in 1995, in 2007 most of the population had Belgian citizenship, which has resulted in a sharp increase of municipal councillors with a foreign background, benefitting from the open proportional electoral system: from none in 1988 to two (from Morocco) in 1994, a near majority of 13 (seven from Morocco, five from Turkey) out of 27 in 2000 (including three aldermen) and a majority of 20 out of 27 in 2007 (including six aldermen out of seven, the seventh is a member of the Flemish minority).

List of mayors
Historical list of mayors or burgomasters of Saint-Josse:
 1800–1808: André-Etienne-Joseph O'Kelly
 1808–1813: Jacques-Joseph De Glimes (GLIM)
 1813: Théodore-Nicolas-Joseph Aerts 1813
 1813–1823: Jean-François Wauvermans
 1823–1842: Urbain Henri Verbist
 1842–1846: Léonard Constant Willems
 1846–1867: Jacques Joseph Damas Gillon
 1867–1870: Louis Guillaume Felix Sainctelette
 1870–1884: Fritz Jottrand
 1885–1899: Armand Steurs
 1900–1926: Henri Frick
 1926–1942: Georges Petre (alderman, then mayor from 1926 until his destitution and assassination by the Rexists in 1942)
 1944–1947: Joseph Dery
 1947–1953: André Saint-Remi
 1953–1999: Guy Cudell
 1999–2012: Jean Demannez (councillor in 1976, alderman in 1977, mayor in 1999, reelected in 2000 and 2006)
 2012–present: Emir Kir

Culture
The Charlier Museum is devoted to Belgian art of the end of the 19th century. The Jazz Station is a museum and archive on jazz, and a venue for jazz concerts.

References

Notes

External links

 Official website 
 Municipal archives – ArchivIris

 
Municipalities of the Brussels-Capital Region
Populated places in Belgium
Turkish diaspora in Europe